Dil-e-Bereham is a 2019 Pakistani romantic drama series, produced by Sadia Jabbar under their banner Sadia Jabbar Productions. The drama airs weekly episode on A-Plus TV every Tuesday. It stars Amar Khan, Maryam Nafees and Wahaj Ali. The show remains incomplete, as it was taken off the air abruptly by the network on 26 April 2019 with only 16 episodes aired.

Plot
The series explores the lives of two opposite persons who belong to two different worlds but fall in love with each other. Ayeza has been sent to Tabish's house to get revenge from the family. However, fate has other plans for them which creates havoc in their lives.

Cast
Wahaj Ali as Tabish
Amar Khan as Ayeza 
Mariyam Nafees as Aleena
Faraz Farooqui as Sheheryar
Tabbasum Arif as Sheheryar's mother
Hina Khawaja Bayat
Anam Tanveer as Nazia
Samina Ahmad
Irsa Ghazal
Behroze Sabzwari

References

External links
Official website

Pakistani drama television series
Urdu-language television shows
2019 Pakistani television series debuts
A-Plus TV original programming